The 1981 Mid-American Conference baseball tournament took place from May 16 to 18 of that year. The top four regular season finishers of the league's ten teams met in the double-elimination tournament held at Bill Theunissen Stadium in Mount Pleasant, Michigan. This was the first time the Mid-American Conference held a postseason tournament to determine a champion. Fourth seeded  won the first tournament to earn the conference's automatic bid to the 1981 NCAA Division I baseball tournament.

Seeding and format 
The top four finishers were seeded one through four based on conference winning percentage only. The teams played a double-elimination tournament.

Results

References 

Tournament
Mid-American Conference Baseball Tournament
Mid-American Conference baseball tournament
Mid-American Conference baseball tournament